Philip Sayer (26 October 1946 – 19 September 1989) was a British actor. He worked for stage, film and television; and was probably best known for his role as Sam Phillips in the science-fiction horror film Xtro (1983).

Biography 
Philip Sayer was born on 26 October 1946 in Swansea, the son of Thomas Henry and Myra Sayer.

He died of cancer in 1989, aged 42.  After Sayers's death, Brian May (who had never met the actor) attended a memorial service and subsequently wrote the song "Just One Life" as a tribute. A Philip Sayer Scholarship fund was set up at LAMDA in Sayer's memory. Sayer Clinics are named after and in memory of Philip Sayer.

In a 2017 interview, actress Susan Sarandon revealed that she had had an affair with Sayer and that he had been gay.

Appearances 
 A Midsummer Night's Dream  (play 1972)
 Miss Julie (film, 1972)
 Adult Fun (film, 1972)
 The Rocky Horror Show (London stage show, 1974) 
 Whodunnit? - Time to Dye (TV Series, 1976) 
 Crown Court (TV Series, 1976) 
 Sebastiane (film, 1976) 
 Rock Follies of 77  (television 1977)
 Van der Valk - Man of Iron (TV Series, 1977)
 BBC2 Play of the Week - Oscar Wilde - Fearless Frank (TV Series, 1978) 
 Play for Today - The After-Dinner Joke (TV Series, 1978) 
 ITV Playhouse - The Reaper (TV series, 1979) 
 Shoestring - The Mayfly Dance (TV Series, 1980) 
 Afurika Monogatari  The Green Horizon (film, 1980)
 ITV Playhouse - A Ferry Ride Away (TV Series, 1981) 
 BBC2 Playhouse - Bobby Wants to Meet Me (TV Series, 1981) 
 Xtro  (film 1983)
 Slayground (film 1983)
 Shades of Darkness (TV series, 1983) 
 Dead on Time (Short, 1983)
 [[The Hunger (1983 film)|The Hunger]] (1983), a horror film starting Catherine Deneuve and David Bowie, based on Whitley Strieber's novel (see below)
 A.D. (1985)
 Inside Out (TV series, 1985)
 Arthur the King (TV Movie, 1985) 
 Bluebell as Marcel Leibovici  (television 1986)
 Shanghai Surprise (film, 1986)
 Floodtide as Dr Ramsey  (television 1987–1988) 
 Star Trap'' as Basil Underwood (TV Movie, 1988)
 Edens Lost (Swedish TV movie, 1991) (released after Sayer's death)

References

External links 
 A tribute by Swansea's Grand Theater

 

1947 births
1989 deaths
Welsh male film actors
Welsh male stage actors
Welsh male television actors
Deaths from lung cancer
Male actors from Swansea
20th-century Welsh male actors
Notting Hill
History of the Royal Borough of Kensington and Chelsea
Welsh gay actors